The 1990 Bausch & Lomb Championships was a women's tennis tournament played on outdoor clay courts at the Amelia Island Plantation on Amelia Island, Florida in the United States that was part of Tier II of the 1990 WTA Tour. It was the 11th edition of the tournament and was held from April 9 through April 15, 1990. First-seeded Steffi Graf won the singles title.

Finals

Singles
 Steffi Graf defeated  Arantxa Sánchez Vicario 6–1, 6–0
 It was Graf's 3rd singles title of the year and the 47th of her career.

Doubles
 Mercedes Paz /  Arantxa Sánchez Vicario defeated  Regina Rajchrtová /  Andrea Temesvári 7–6(7–5), 6–4
 It was Paz' 1st title of the year and the 16th of her career. It was Sánchez Vicario's 2nd title of the year and the 3rd of her career.

References

External links
 ITF tournament edition details

Bausch and Lomb Championships
Amelia Island Championships
Bausch & Lomb Championships
Bausch & Lomb Championships
Bausch & Lomb Championships